Ylämaa (literally translated the "Highland") is a former municipality of Finland, located in the province of Southern Finland as part of the South Karelia region. It was consolidated with Lappeenranta on January 1, 2010.

The municipality was unilingually Finnish.

There is a strong concentration of the spectrolite in the region of Ylämaa, which is well-known for gemstones and minerals. Plans to build a pyramid in Ylämaa have existed since 1998, but as of 2010 the project has been on hold due to the high cost.

References

External links

Municipality of Ylämaa – Official website

Former municipalities of Finland
Lappeenranta
Populated places established in 1925
Populated places disestablished in 2010